Justo Navarro (born 1953) is a Spanish poet and novelist. He was born in Granada, and is a graduate of Granada University. He has published half a dozen novels including Accidentes íntimos, which won the Premio Herralde de Novela, and La casa del padre (1994), winner of the Premio Andalucía de la Crítica. He won the same prize again with his detective novel Gran Granada (2016). He is also a highly regarded poet, having won the Premio de la Crítica for his collection Un aviador prevé su muerte. As a translator, he has translated English language writers such as T.S. Eliot, Virginia Woolf, F. Scott Fitzgerald and Paul Auster.[1]

References

Spanish male poets
Spanish male novelists
Spanish translators
20th-century Spanish novelists
20th-century Spanish poets
20th-century translators
21st-century Spanish novelists
21st-century Spanish poets
21st-century translators
University of Granada alumni
Writers from Andalusia
People from Granada
1953 births
Living people
20th-century Spanish male writers
21st-century Spanish male writers